María Sólrún Sigurðardóttir, (August 1, 1965 in Reykjavík, Iceland) also credited as Maria Solrun is a German film director and screenwriter. She is best known for her  work on the films Adam and Jargo.

Life and career
María was born in Reykjavík, Iceland and graduated from the German Film and Television Academy Berlin (dffb).

María's debut feature film Jargo, starring Constantin von Jascheroff, Oktay Özdemir, premiered at the Berlin International Film Festival and won two awards at the Sarajevo Film Festival. In 2018, her second feature film Adam, starting Ivar Asgeirsson, Matthias Brenner, Floriane Daniel, premiered at the Berlin International Film Festival. She has worked as a screenwriter for several film production companies including Columbia Tristar, Sony Pictures, Studio Hamburg, X Filme and Boje Buck Productions. Since 2006 she has also been working as a film and television fiction consultant for the Icelandic Film Centre.

Filmography

References

External links

1965 births
German mass media people
Icelandic emigrants to Germany
Naturalized citizens of Germany
Living people